Bulk bins are a way of selling consumables by weight.  The product is stored in bins in a section of the retail floor.  A customer can measure out an amount of product into a plastic bag, to be later weighed at the point of sale.  The product is usually less expensive per unit compared to pre-packaged items.  The customer is able to choose exactly how much product they want and will go home with less packaging.

Products compatible with bulk bin selling are:
Nails
Grains
Spices
Candy
Coffee
Powdered or granulated items

Traditional bulk bins were typically wooden barrels, or burlap sacks the food products came in, and from which the customer would shop.  These traditional methods of dispensing were cheap, and did not protect the food products from open air environments which allowed the accelerated spoilage of food, and created the potential for outside contaminants to affect the food.

Today, bulk bins are made of polycarbonate, or BPA-free resins which display the food product, and provide an airtight, hygienic system for dispensing foods.

Perishable or bulky items usually are not sold in this way.

Food retailing
Retail store elements